Daatsʼiin is a Gumuz language of western Ethiopia. There are two communities of speakers in western Ethiopia, one in Mahadid, on the northeast border of Alitash National Park, and one in Inashemesh on the Sudan border, south of the park where the Rahad River crosses from Ethiopia into Sudan.

Daatsʼiin was first reported in 2013 and described by Colleen Ahland in 2014. Ahland has described it further in 2016. A comparative word list of Daatsʼiin, Northern Gumuz, and Southern Gumuz is available in Ahland & Kelly (2014).

Of the other Gumuz languages, Daatsʼíin has the greatest lexical similarity to Southern Gumuz, but the two groups communicate in Arabic or Amharic.

Phonology
The consonant inventory of Daatsʼíin:

Daatsʼíin has eight vowel phonemes:

Daatsʼíin is also a tonal language: vowels can bear high, low and rarely also falling tone. Some examples of downstep occur.

Grammar
Daatsʼíin has several grammatical differences from other Gumuz languages. Verbs inflect for aspect (perfective–imperfective) rather than for tense (future–non-future). Verbs are polysynthetic in all languages, but the order of the morphemes differs in Daatsʼiin, and some morphemes that occur in one language do not occur in the other(s). "The major constituent order in Daatsʼíin clauses tend to be AVO/SV."

Notes

Literature
 

Languages of Ethiopia
Bʼaga languages